Sollerud is a light rail station on the Oslo Tramway.

Located at Sollerud in Ullern borough, it was opened by Kristiania Elektriske Sporvei together with the rest of the Lilleaker Line, as an extension of the Skøyen Line. The station is served by line 13.

References

Oslo Tramway stations in Oslo
Railway stations opened in 1919
1919 establishments in Norway